This is a list of squads selected for the 2013 ICC Champions Trophy.

Group A

Australia
Coach:  Mickey Arthur

England
Coach:  Ashley Giles

New Zealand
Coach:  Mike Hesson

Sri Lanka
Coach:  Graham Ford

Group B

India
Coach:  Duncan Fletcher

Pakistan
Coach:  Dav Whatmore

South Africa
Coach:  Gary Kirsten

West Indies
Coach:  Ottis Gibson

References

External links
 ICC Champions Trophy 2013 Squads on ESPN Cricinfo

2013 Squads
2013 ICC Champions Trophy